The Countryside Council for Wales (CCW) was a Welsh Assembly sponsored body responsible for wildlife conservation, landscape and countryside access authority of Wales.

It was merged with Forestry Commission Wales, and Environment Agency Wales to form Natural Resources Wales, a single body managing Wales' environment and natural resources, on 1 April 2013.

As a statutory advisory and prosecuting body, the Countryside Council for Wales 'championed the environment and landscapes of Wales and its coastal waters as sources of natural and cultural riches, as a foundation for economic and social activity, and as a place for leisure and learning opportunities'. It aimed to 'make the environment a valued part of everyone's life in Wales'.

The Council of CCW consisted of a Chairman and a maximum of ten members. They were appointed by the Welsh Government which also provided CCW's annual budget. The Council gave direction to the around 500 staff.  CCW's headquarters was in Bangor, Gwynedd, North Wales, with other offices across Wales.

CCW activities

Advice
CCW gave advice to government on a wide range of matters affecting the countryside. This included threats to the environment, the impacts of developments and changes in land use, international environmental matters and new legislation. CCW also advised on the declaration of marine nature reserves, land for protection under European Union Directives and other international obligations, and land designated by local authorities such as Heritage Coasts and Local Nature Reserves.

Establishing protected areas
As well as advising government and local authorities on land which should be protected, CCW was able to designate several categories of land to protect and conserve wildlife or landscape. These include national nature reserves and Sites of Special Scientific Interest as well as national parks and Areas of Outstanding Natural Beauty. National trails were mapped out and negotiated in the first instance by CCW. Though protected areas represent the most special parts of the Welsh environment, CCW's conservation responsibilities transcended these boundaries and covered the whole of Wales. Wales has 70 national nature reserves, three national parks, five Areas of Outstanding Natural Beauty (AONBs), and Sites of Special Scientific Interest cover around 12% of Wales. About 70% of the Welsh coastline is protected.

Through discussions and management agreements CCW attempted to ensure that the wildlife value of SSSIs, most of which are privately owned and occupied, was retained and enhanced.

Protecting rare species
Rare and threatened animals and plants are protected by law so that they are not disturbed or destroyed though there is occasionally a justifiable need to disturb these species. In these cases CCW advised and issued licences for individuals and organisations including for example, photographers and research scientists.

Promoting enjoyment of the countryside
Part of CCW's remit was to improve opportunities for people to enjoy the countryside. By working closely with local authorities and other organisations, improvements were made to the system of public paths. CCW also worked to establish a Wales Coast Path which was officially launched in May 2012.

Health and well-being

Working with others
CCW worked with others on joint projects, local government being one of the closest partners. Other partnership projects ranged from joint educational activities to major engineering projects to regulate water levels on wetlands. Many projects were funded by CCW grants, enabling others to use their special skills and understanding of local communities to carry out environmental tasks on their behalf.

Research and survey

CCW and the rest of the UK
CCW was one of a network of government-funded bodies that perform comparable duties throughout the United Kingdom. These other bodies are:

Natural England 
NatureScot
Environment and Heritage Service (Northern Ireland)

See also
List of conservation topics
Conservation in the United Kingdom
National nature reserves in Wales
List of Sites of Special Scientific Interest by Area of Search
List of Special Areas of Conservation in Wales
Tir Cymen

References

External links
Countryside Council for Wales
'The Welsh View' - CCW blog
'Ein Golygfa' - Blog CCGC
Natural Resources Wales

 
Welsh Government sponsored bodies
Environmental organisations based in Wales
1990 establishments in Wales
2013 disestablishments in Wales
Government agencies established in 1990
Government agencies disestablished in 2013
Research organisations based in Wales